= Hadjé Bintou Kachallah Kasser =

- Born: Chad
- Occupation: Journalist
- Employer(s): Chadian Press and Publishing Agency (ATPE)
- Known for: Director-General of the Chadian Press and Publishing Agency (ATPE)
- Title: Former Director-General of ATPE

Hadjé Bintou Kachallah Kasser is a Chadian journalist and former director general of the Chadian Press and Publishing Agency (ATPE).

== Biography ==
Bintou Kachallah is a member of the delegation of the Atlantic Federation of African News Agencies to COP 22.

In 2014, she was a communications assistant for UNFPA Chad., the UN agency in charge of sexual and reproductive health issues.

In 2017, she was appointed Deputy Director General of the Chadian Press and Publishing Agency under Ali Kaya Abba. Then, on April 30 of the same year, she was put in charge of the publishing department of the organization, a position she relinquished some time later.

She became the Director-General of ATPE on Monday, May 23, 2022 by decree, assisted by Khalil Mahamat Ibrahim, following the serious operational crisis that has affected the organization for a year.

On April 25, 2025, she was replaced as head of the Chadian Press Agency (ATPE) by Hissien Bosquet Khamis,.
